The Elephant Building is part of a leisure complex in Coventry city centre, England. It was intended to extend the pre-existing Coventry Central Baths building, to which it is connected with an enclosed walkway (the "elephant's trunk").

History

The main building of the leisure complex was opened in 1966, providing Coventry with the region's only Olympic-size swimming pool with seating for spectators, making it a focal point for swimming in the West Midlands. A ring road around Coventry was completed in 1972, leaving a small area of land either side of Cox Street at the end of the Coventry Baths building. The city architect's department designed a building to straddle the road, and construction started on the Elephant building in 1974. After construction finished in 1976, it was used as part of Coventry Sports & Leisure Centre until it was closed by Coventry City Council in February 2020. The main building was Grade II listed in 1997, but the Elephant itself is not listed.

Design
The building is designed to look like an elephant in reference to the coat of arms of the city of Coventry, which shows Coventry Castle being carried on the back of an elephant. Elephants are a popular motif in the civic life of Coventry, appearing on the logo of Coventry City F.C. and Coventry R.F.C. as well as the badge of HMS Coventry.

Future
The future of the Elephant building is uncertain after the closure of the leisure centre in 2020. Coventry City Council is yet to announce firm plans for the building's redevelopment, but it may become a community art space. On May 15, 2021, as part of the launch for Coventry being UK City of Culture 2021, the words of local author George Elliot "It is always  fatal to have music or poetry interrupted" were projected onto the building.

References

Buildings and structures in Coventry
Buildings and structures completed in 1976
Brutalist architecture in the United Kingdom